Lilla snigel is a traditional Swedish children's song for very young children, which is very simple to sing. The song is about a snail and was published in Våra visor, part 1, 1957.

Publications
Våra visor 1, 1957.
Lek med toner, 1971 (angiven som "Lekvisa")
Barnvisor och sånglekar till enkelt komp, 1984

Recordings
An early recording was done in an arrangement by Plinque plonque musique, and released on a record in 1989. A Persian-language-version, "Halzun", was recorded by Simin Habibi in 1991.

References

Barnens svenska sångbok (1999)

1957 songs
Swedish children's songs
Swedish-language songs
Songs about invertebrates